Samir Boitard is a French actor.

Personal life
He has been in a relationship  with French actor Louise Monot since 2014. In October 2016 they announced on social media that they were expecting their first child.

Filmography

See also
Cinema of France

References

External links

 Official Website

Year of birth missing (living people)
Living people
21st-century French male actors
Male actors from Paris
French male film actors
French male television actors